Artyom Dubinin (born March 30, 1989) is a Russian professional ice hockey player. He is currently playing with THK Tver of the VHL.

Dubinin made his Kontinental Hockey League debut playing with Tolyatti Lada during the 2008–09 season.

References

External links
 

1989 births
Living people
Amur Khabarovsk players
Russian ice hockey centres
Sportspeople from Tolyatti